Robert Wrastley or Wrestley was an English politician.

He was a Member (MP) of the Parliament of England for Chippenham in October 1553.

References

Year of birth missing
Year of death missing
English MPs 1553 (Mary I)